Khwarrahbud was a 4th-century Iranian scribe (dabir) active during the reign of the Sasanian king (shah) Shapur II. Attested in Armenian as Khorōhbowt, Khwarrahbud was captured during Shapur II's wars against the Romans. During his stay in Roman territory, Khwarrahbud learned Greek and wrote a book on the accomplishments of Shapur II and Julian. Furthermore, Khwarrahbud also later translated into Greek a Persian book written by Rāstsakhwan (attested in Armenian as Rastsohown), one of his captive associates. The book was later used by the 6th-century historian Agathias.

References

Sources 
 

Year of birth unknown
Year of death unknown
4th-century Iranian people
Shapur II
People of the Roman–Sasanian Wars
4th-century historians
4th-century writers
Iranian prisoners of war
Translators from Persian
Greek-language writers